Aldrin is a pesticide.

Aldrin may also refer to:

Astronomy
 6470 Aldrin, an asteroid
 Aldrin (crater), a lunar crater

People
 Anders G. Aldrin, an American engraver
 Buzz Aldrin (born 1930), Second Man On The Moon
 Edwin Eugene Aldrin Sr. (1896-1974), an American military officer

Other
 Lily Aldrin, a fictional character in How I Met Your Mother
 Aldrin Pesky, character in The Buzz on Maggie